TVB News, formally known as the News and Information Division, is the newsgathering arm of Hong Kong's Television Broadcasts Limited (TVB), responsible for different news programme in TVB Jade, Pearl and Finance & Information Channel, also the News Channel. Its slogan is "TVB News Cares" (無綫新聞 事事關心). TVB News was ranked last in credibility among TV and radio channels in Hong Kong in a 2019 CUHK survey.

History
On 19 November 1967, TVB premiered its very first 2 News Report programmes, the evening News at 7:30 and Late News/News Roundup (22:30). On 16 November 1970, Noon News and News Headlines were also added into TVB Jade's schedule. On 1 November 1976, News at 7:30 was renamed News at 6:30 as the newscast moved back by one-hour. On 1 January 1968, the first Morning Talk and News programme, Morning Assembly, hosted by the news editor Edward Ho, From 19 April 1976 to 29 April 1977, the show was renamed Morning News Report. On 19 November 1980, the Nightly News at Ten was launched. On 6 September 1981, Good Morning Hong Kong premiered and currently airs from Monday to Saturday. On 19 November 1967, the first few male news anchors: David Lee, Josiah Lau, Chu Wai Tak, Stephen Shiu. On 2 January 1978, the first female first anchor Anite Yip debuted on TVB News. On 4 January 1988, all news programmes on both TVB Jade and Pearl updated their opening sequence with the day's date and the headline sequences. On 1 January 1980, Cantonese subtitles were introduced. On 3 January 1983, News at 9:30 added subtitles and was renamed News File in 1985. News File ended on 14 May 1993. On Monday, 2 September 1996, computer subtitling was reintroduced and has remained ever since on all newscasts. On 21 September 2003, TVB and its news department, along with other divisions moved to TVB City at Tseung Kwan O. Subtitles was also included on TVB Pearl on 17 October 2006.

On 13 July 2008, TVB News programmes started broadcasting in 16:9. On 2 February 2009, TVB News programmes started in High Definition permanently. On 30 June 2012, TVB iNews converted from Standard Definition to High Definition, News ticker was also modified to fit the HDTV screens and News Titles for iNews was also updated.

On 27 August 2012, tvb.com began to include more News, Finance, Weather and Information in its website.

On 15 November 2012, Weather Report began broadcasting in high definition and in subtitles for the first time. On 1 January 2013, TVB Jade, TVB HD Jade, TVB iNews and TVB Pearl modified their subtitles to fit into high definition.

On 20 May 2013, TVB iNews remodified their schedules and broadcast the news programmes live and continuously in high definition.

On 14 July 2013, TVB News updated their opening sequences to make it more realistic. On Sunday, 1 June 2014, TVB News' main news studio were given a major revamp as well as the new titles for all of its news programmes and subtitles. Good Morning Hong Kong also updated its opening sequences on Monday, 9 June 2014.

On 22 February 2016, Putonghua News moved to TVB J5 (later renamed TVB Finance and Information Channel in January 2018) after 26 years on TVB Pearl until it moved back at 13 April 2020.

Broadcasting and Production
TVB News Time Schedule the anchors monthly, first news report from Monday to Friday or from Saturday to Sunday don't anchors, News at 6:30, News at 7 and News at 7:30 with two male and female  presenters, Good Morning Hong Kong news and finance two presenters, and other programmes. Except Noon News, Monday to Friday News at 6:30 and News at 7, TVB Jade main news with sports anchors. TVB iNews and TVBN Main News at 8 Hong Kong Stock Exchange with Finance anchors and everyday sports anchors, and other programmes. On 2 February 2009, TVB News focus changed into  News Roundup, which is broadcast every Monday to Friday. By adding special, first anchors,  focus report and first broadcasting television. Live, reporter changed head, added or anchors. In March 2015, Luk Hon-tak, former director-general of the Democratic Alliance for the Betterment and Progress of Hong Kong (DAB), became the managing editor of TVB News in charge of political news stories.

Newscasts

TVB News is broadcast at the following time slots on the company's free-to-air channels, TVB Jade, TVB Pearl, TVB Finance & Information Channel and TVB News Channel.

TVB Jade newscasts
"On News Channel": programme is also broadcast on TVB News Channel.

TVB Pearl newscasts

Format

All newscasts on TVB Jade are in Cantonese; Putonghua Financial Report is in Mandarin. The newscasts on TVB Pearl are in English while newscasts on TVB Finance & Information Channel are in Mandarin. Good Morning Hong Kong and Putonghua Financial Report, and other business newscasts are seen on weekdays. Also, programmes have in-vision captions for the hearing impaired, as mandated by local regulations (this was originally only used on the Jade version's News File, 新聞簡報) or News Daily (TVB Pearl). In the past, both channels aired a 5-minute News File, giving the top headlines of the day and a preview of the News Roundup; it usually aired at various times around 21:00.

The starting sequence of the news features the sound of the Morse code signal for "NEWS TODAY"
(        ), with the pitch at about 1700 Hz.

Standalone weather reports are aired after the News at 6:30 on TVB Jade, the News at 7:30 on TVB Pearl and Putonghua News on TVB J2. They are famous for Freddy, a cartoon figure which gives the forecast for the next day. The highly stylised and comical format is considered an institution, and is widely recognised by many Hong Kong people. (The rest of the weather forecast is read by an actual human presenter.)

After the news and/or weather is presented, Earth Live usually follows afterwards, which is produced by earthTV. However, not all newscasts on TVB Jade are not followed by that programme, but will instead return to the current programme. The only exception is Good Morning Hong Kong, which would air Earth Live first, then immediately start the morning news. Earth Live also airs a couple more times during their morning news programme.

News programmes
Investigative reports and extended news stories are often shown on three programmes: Sunday Report and News Magazine on TVB Jade, The Pearl Report on TVB Pearl. Sunday Report and The Pearl Report focus more on stories involving individuals and has a softer approach, while News Magazine focuses more on social problems in general.

News channel
Additionally, TVB's news department is also responsible for the output on the 24-hour news channel, TVBN, carried on the pay TV platform TVB Pay Vision and iNews (Start from 11 November 2008) on HK Digital TV Broadcast (Channel 83). In June 2006, another news channel, TVBN 2, will also be carried on the pay TV platform TVB Pay Vision.

The transmission of iNews have been upgraded from SDTV to HDTV video format on 30 June 2012.

Criticism
In a 2019 survey conducted by the Chinese University of Hong Kong, TVB News was ranked last in credibility among TV and radio channels in Hong Kong.

During the 2014 protests, TVB's broadcast of footage of seven police officers beating a protester on 15 October resulted in significant internal conflict during the broadcast. The pre-dawn broadcasts soundtrack which mentioned "punching and kicking" was re-recorded, and later bulletins said that the officers were "suspected of using excessive force". TVB director Keith Yuen questioned what grounds lead the footage to say "officers dragged him to a dark corner, and punched and kicked him"? Ho Wing-hong, the assistant supervisor of the news-gathering team responsible for the footage, was immediately demoted to Chief Researcher, a post with only a part-time subordinate. Many journalists expressed their dissatisfaction with the handling of the broadcast, and some 80 TVB staff from all departments objecting to the handling sent a petition to management. After several of its reporters were assaulted by activists attending a pro-Beijing rally, over 340 station employees put their names to a petition condemning the violence. A director of production in the non-drama department ordered all petitioners to a meeting with their supervisors, where the employees were asked to remove their signature or jeopardise their year end bonuses.

In March 2015, former DAB partisan Luk Hon-tak's appointment as the managing editor of TVB News in charge of political news stories caused significant concern among the company. Although news director Keith Yuen maintained that there were no political considerations in Luk's appointment, some TVB News staff are questioning the unusual appointment and the political nature of the role. They pointed to Luk's strongly pro-establishment background, as most of the senior management posts were filled by internal promotion. There was an exodus of in late February when at least seven journalists, including Ho Wing-hong, tendered their resignations.

TVB News was criticized for biased coverage during the 2019–20 Hong Kong protests, with Communications Authority receiving approximately 12,000 complaints. In light of this, some companies, including the Hong Kong branches of Pocari Sweat and Pizza Hut, withdrew their advertisements from TVB, drawing praise from anti-extradition protestors.

References

External links
 TVB News official website  
 TVB News Channel official website  

Mass media in Hong Kong
Television stations in Hong Kong
TVB
24-hour television news channels in China
Chinese propaganda organisations